The deputy prime minister of Bangladesh, officially Deputy Prime Minister of the People's Republic of Bangladesh is the Deputy Prime Minister of the Government of the People's Republic of Bangladesh and the second highest ranking Parliamentary Leader of the Jatiya Sangsad.  A Deputy Prime Minister may, in the absence of the Prime Minister, carry out the functions of the Cabinet as well as the responsibilities of any other independent ministry.

List
Political Party

See also
 Prime Minister of Bangladesh
 Government of Bangladesh

Reference

Deputy prime ministers
Government of Bangladesh
Lists of political office-holders in Bangladesh